Kevin van Veen (born 1 June 1991) is a Dutch professional footballer who plays as a forward for Scottish Premiership side Motherwell. He formerly played professionally for FC Oss, Helmond Sport, SC Cambuur, Northampton Town and Scunthorpe United.

Career

Early career
Born in Eindhoven, Netherlands, van Veen started out playing football at PSV. He spent six years at the academy before moving to Helmond Sport in 2005. He was promoted to the first team in 2010. He went on to make six appearances for Helmond Sport before moving to Dijkse Boys,

At some point of his career, van Veen took other jobs, such as plasterer, working for a friend's company and sometimes going out on jobs prior to attending training. van Veen also played for UDI '19 and JVC Cuijk.

FC Oss
In July 2014, it was announced that FC Oss had signed van Veen on a one–year contract.

After making his FC Oss debut, van Veen scored a hat–trick in the next game on 15 August 2014, in a 3–0 win over RKC Waalwijk. van Veen then scored consecutively on two occasions; the first one came when he scored two goals in two games between 25 August 2014 and 30 August 2014 against VVV-Venlo and De Graafschap and the second one came when he scored three goals in three games between 3 October 2014 and 26 October 2014 against MVV Maastricht, Eindhoven and N.E.C. He then scored his second FC Oss hat–trick but was sent–off for the second bookable offence, in a 5–4 win over Fortuna Sittard on 12 December 2014. After returning from suspension, van Veen scored his third FC Oss hat–trick on 23 January 2015, in a 4–1 win over Almere City. Amid to scoring sixteen goals in twenty–one appearances, van Veen was linked a move away from FC Oss, attracting interests from English clubs in League One.

Scunthorpe United
In the January transfer window, van Veen was a subject of a transfer bid from English side Scunthorpe United on 28 January 2015. The move was confirmed on 30 January 2015, with van Veen signing a three-and-a half year deal for an undisclosed fee.

van Veen made his Scunthorpe United debut, coming on as a second-half substitute, in a 1–0 loss against Oldham Athletic on 7 February 2015. A week later, he scored his first goal for the club by chipping past Wes Foderingham, in a 3–1 win over Swindon Town. After the match, Manager Mark Robins commented on his first goal, quoting: "His goal was joy to behold. He is a really confident lad and confident in his ability to put the ball in the net." He scored again on 21 March 2015, in a 3–1 loss against Rochdale. At the end of the 2014–15 season, van Veen went on to make twenty appearances and scoring two times in all competitions.

At the start of the 2015–16 season, van Veen remained a first team regular at the club despite being featured most of the first half of the season on the substitute bench. However, in a 0–0 draw against Millwall on 22 August 2015, he suffered a head injury and had to be substituted in the second half as a result. Eventually, he recovered in time for the match against Colchester United on 29 August 2015 and scored in a 2–2 draw. This earned him the club's Goal of the Month for August. His second goal came on 10 October 2015, in a 4–2 win over Oldham Athletic. However, van Veen soon lost his first team place throughout the first half of the season. Although he was loaned out for the second half of the season, he went on to make twenty–five appearances and scoring two times in all competitions.

Ahead of the 2016–17 season, van Veen was given a number ten shirt for the new season. He started the 2016–17 season when he scored in the opening game of the season, in a 3–1 win over Bristol Rovers. van Veen also scored four goals throughout August against Notts County (twice), Fleetwood Town (in which he was later voted Goal of the Season) and Gillingham. van Veen then established himself in the first team for the side this season, forming a striking partnership with Paddy Madden. By the end of 2016, he scored four league goals for the side and his performance attracted interest from Chinese Super League side Henan Jianye, who had their £4 million bid rejected. Manager Graham Alexander confirmed that the bid had been rejected, citing his desire to keep him. Despite this, van Veen continued to remain in the first team for the rest of the 2016–17 season, in which he scored two more goals against Charlton Athletic and Coventry City. His goal against Coventry City earned him April's Goal of the Month. Although he made forty–two appearances and scoring twelve times in all competitions, van Veen played an important role at the club this season for "his more than capable of providing an attacking threat from the position".

Cambuur (loan)
In January 2016, van Veen was subsequently loaned out to SC Cambuur for the rest of the 2015–16 season. It came after when he became a replacement for the departing Bartholomew Ogbeche.

van Veen made his SC Cambuur debut, where he started the whole game, in a 2–0 loss against Groningen on 7 February 2016. It wasn't until on 2 April 2016 when he scored his first goal for the club, in a 2–2 draw against De Graafschap. Although he scored once, van Veen became a first team regular, making twelve appearances for the club.

Northampton Town
On 30 January 2018, van Veen signed for fellow League One side Northampton Town on a two-and-a-half-year deal for an undisclosed fee. He made his debut for the club on 3 February 2018, coming off the bench in a 1–0 defeat at home to Rochdale. He would go on to make 10 appearances for Northampton in the 2017–18 season, scoring 0 goals as Northampton were relegated to EFL League Two.

Van Veen started the season in fine form for Northampton scoring in his first match of the season in a 2–2 draw with Carlisle United before following this up with a brace the following week in another 2–2 draw, this time with Cambridge United. He made his last appearance for the club in a 2–1 defeat to Forest Green Rovers on 1 January 2019. He played 38 times in total for Northampton and scored ten goals over two seasons.

Return to Scunthorpe United
On 1 January 2019, van Veen returned to Scunthorpe United for an undisclosed fee following a spell with Northampton Town. He played fourteen games, for Scunthorpe, in the 2018–19 season and only scored once. Scunthorpe United were relegated from League One. His next season, in League Two, saw him play 27 league games and score ten goals. He also scored three goals in six cup competitions, including a brace against a strong Manchester City U21s side. In this game, he was also involved in some controversy with Taylor Harwood-Bellis, van Veen pushed the youngster into some hoardings and then van Veen claimed he "cashed [him] up" by saying "[Harwood-Bellis] had more money than [van Veen]." Harwood-Bellis denied the claims and eventually Pep Guardiola publicly defended Harwood-Bellis.

Despite a strong season from van Veen, Scunthorpe were in a relegation battle. Due to COVID-19, the season was cancelled and a point-per-game format helped Scunthorpe survive relegation. In the next season, van Veen started well, scoring twice in 2 games, but would go goalless for the rest of the season and Scunthorpe were once again in a relegation battle. They avoided relegation by just one place. Following an extremely underwhelming 2020–21 season, van Veen decided to not renew his contract, deciding instead to become a free agent.

Motherwell 
On 2 July 2021, van Veen signed for Scottish Premiership side Motherwell. His move there saw him reunited with ex-Scunthorpe manager, Graham Alexander. He made his debut in a 1–0 win against Queen's Park in the Scottish League Cup, and made his Scottish Premier League debut (and scored his first goal) in a 3–2 loss to Hibernian.

On 26 July 2022, van Veen signed a one-year extension to his contract, keeping him at Motherwell until the summer of 2024.

Personal life 
Van Veen grew up supporting PSV Eindhoven and idolising Ruud van Nistelrooy.

Career statistics

External links

References

1991 births
Living people
Footballers from Eindhoven
Association football forwards
Dutch footballers
Helmond Sport players
TOP Oss players
Scunthorpe United F.C. players
SC Cambuur players
Motherwell F.C. players
Northampton Town F.C. players
Eredivisie players
Eerste Divisie players
English Football League players
Scottish Professional Football League players
Dutch expatriate footballers
Expatriate footballers in England
Expatriate footballers in Scotland
Dutch expatriate sportspeople in England
Dutch expatriate sportspeople in Scotland